Philip Joseph Pierre (born 18 September 1954) is a Saint Lucian politician currently serving as the prime minister of Saint Lucia since 28 July 2021. Pierre serves as the Minister for Finance, Economic Development and the Youth Economy. He is the Leader of the Saint Lucia Labour Party since 18 June 2016. He has represented the Castries East constituency in the House of Assembly since 1997.

Pierre previously served as Minister for Tourism, Civil Aviation and International Financial Services from 1997 to 2000; Deputy Prime Minister and Minister for Infrastructure, Port Services and Transport from 2011 to 2016; and as Leader of the Opposition from 2016 to 2021.

Early life 
Pierre's mother Evelyn was a schoolteacher, and his father Auguste was a policeman.  He studied at Saint Mary's College, then completed a BA (hons) in economics and a Master of Business Administration from the University of the West Indies.  After graduation, he taught at Saint Mary's College and worked as a trainee manager at J.Q. Charles Ltd.  Pierre then entered the finance industry: he worked as an audit clerk at Coopers & Lybrand and Pannell Kerr Forster, and as a financial controller at Stanthur Co. Ltd.

From 1985 to 1994, Pierre was the Director of the National Research and Development Corporation.  He was also Chief Executive of his own management consultancy firm, Philip J. Pierre Business Services Ltd., from 1990 to 1997.

Politics 
Pierre joined the Saint Lucia Labour Party (SLP) in 1985, and served as the party treasurer from 1986 to 1992.  In 1992, he contested the general elections for the first time in Castries East, but did not win.  After serving as the SLP chairman from 1992 to 1996, Pierre ran again in 1997 and won.  In the resulting SLP government led by Kenny Anthony, Pierre served as Minister for Tourism, Civil Aviation and International Financial Services from 1997 to 2000.

Pierre was re-elected to the House of Assembly from Castries East in the general elections of 2001, 2006, and 2011.  In 2011, he was sworn in as Deputy Prime Minister and Minister for Infrastructure, Port Services, and Transportation. Pierre retained his seat in the 2016 general election, but the SLP lost the election.  Kenny Anthony resigned as party leader; Pierre was then elected as his successor on 18 June 2016.  He also became the parliamentary Leader of the Opposition.

Pierre is a member of the Commonwealth Parliamentary Association (CPA).  He also joined the Assembly of Caribbean Community Parliamentarians, attending its inaugural 1996 meeting in Barbados.

Pierre led the SLP in the 2021 general election, where the party won a majority of seats.  He was sworn in as Prime Minister of Saint Lucia on 28 July 2021.

References

|-

|-

|-

Living people
1954 births
Members of the House of Assembly of Saint Lucia
Saint Lucia Labour Party politicians
University of the West Indies alumni
Prime Ministers of Saint Lucia
Deputy Prime Ministers of Saint Lucia
Economy ministers of Saint Lucia
Finance ministers of Saint Lucia
Infrastructure ministers of Saint Lucia
Postal services ministers of Saint Lucia
Transport ministers of Saint Lucia
Youth ministers of Saint Lucia